George H. Battis (1863 – 1937) was an American politician who served on the Boston Common Council, Boston Board of Aldermen, and the Massachusetts House of Representatives.

Early life
Battis was born on January 19, 1863, in East Boston. He attended Boston public schools. Outside of politics, Battis worked as a wholesale shoe salesman. At one time he served a president of Winch Brothers.

Political career
In 1892, Battis was elected chairman of the Ward 1 Republican committee. From 1899 to 1901, Battis was a member of the Boston Common Council. From 1902 to 1904 he represented the 1st Suffolk District (consisting of Ward 1) in the Massachusetts House of Representatives. In 1904 he served as chairman of the House Committee on Printing.  From 1906 to 1907 he was a member of the Boston Board of Alderman.

Larceny conviction
In 1909, Battis was indicted for larceny. He was alleged to have charged the city of Boston $334.25 more than he actually paid for trophies he purchased for the East Boston Fourth of July celebrations in 1906 and 1907. His first trial ended on March 23, 1909. After nine and a half hours of deliberation, the jury was unable to reach a decision. His second trial began on May 25, 1909.  On May 28, the jury returned a guilty verdict. He received a three-year sentence and was sent to Deer Island Prison. On December 22, 1910, Battis received a pardon from Governor Eben Sumner Draper and the Massachusetts Governor's Council. Battis' poor health, his good behavior in prison, and the fact that others who had been implicated in similar cases had received lighter sentences, were reported to be factors in the decision to pardon him.

Death
Upon his release from prison, Battis returned to East Boston.  He died in September 1937.

References

1863 births
1937 deaths
19th-century American politicians
20th-century American politicians
American people convicted of theft
Boston Board of Aldermen members
Boston City Council members
Massachusetts politicians convicted of crimes
Republican Party members of the Massachusetts House of Representatives
Politicians from Boston
Recipients of American gubernatorial pardons